Catherine De Bolle (born 17 February 1970) is the executive director of Europol, succeeding Rob Wainwright whose term expired on 1 May 2018. Before that she was the chief commissioner of the Belgian federal police (1 March 2012–1 May 2018) and chief of the police of zone Ninove (2001–2012).

Biography 
De Bolle studied law at the Ghent University between 1988 and 1993 and went on to receive an officer training  at the Rijkswacht from 1994 till 1997. In 1994 and 2001 she was active as a lawyer with the Federal police, and in 2001 she was nominated chief of staff in Ninove.

She attained the degree of lieutenant on March 28, 1997 and became chief commissioner on January 1, 2005.

Commissioner-general of the Federal Police
After commissioner-general Fernand Koekelberg decommissioned in March 2011 and Paul Van Thielen became commissioner-general ad interim, De Bolle postulated as candidate. The selection committee of the general inspection deemed her to be the most adequate candidate for the position. After confirmation of this choice by the Federal Police Board, her assignment as very first female commissioner general was confirmed by the council of ministers and she was appointed by the King. De Bolle took the oath of office on February 29 and on March 1, 2012 she started in the function.

In 2015 De Bolle became the European representative of the executing committee of Interpol, a mandate of 3 years.

Executive Director of Europol
Since 1 May 2018 De Bolle was appointed as the Executive Director of Europol, being succeeded as commissioner-general by Marc De Mesmaeker.

Other activities
 European Council on Foreign Relations (ECFR), Member of the Council
 International Gender Champions (IGC), Member

Distinction 
  Commandeur, Order of the Belgian Cross

References

Belgian police officers
1970 births
Living people
Women in law enforcement